Carl Hermann Wentzel (5 December 1895 – 29 September 1952) was a sailor from Germany, who represented his country at the 1928 Summer Olympics in Amsterdam, Netherlands.

Sources 
 

Sailors at the 1928 Summer Olympics – 6 Metre
Olympic sailors of Germany
German male sailors (sport)
1895 births
1952 deaths